"Nostalgia" is a song by Italian singer Blanco. It was released as a single on 3 June 2022 by Island Records. It was written by Blanco and Michelangelo, and produced by Michelangelo.

Music video
The music video for "Nostalgia", directed by Simone Peluso and filmed in New York City, was released on 3 June 2022 via Blanco's YouTube channel.

Personnel
Credits adapted from Tidal.
 Blanco – associated performer, lyricist, composer, vocals
 Michelangelo – producer and composer

Charts

Weekly charts

Year-end charts

Certifications

References

2022 singles
2022 songs
Island Records singles
Blanco (singer) songs
Songs written by Blanco (singer)